Gerrit "Gert" van den Berg (born 10 October 1935 in Rotterdam) is a former Dutch politician. As a member of the Reformed Political Party (SGP) he was a member of the Dutch Senate from 1995 to 2011.

Van den Berg is a member of the Reformed Congregations.

References 
  Parlement.com biography

1935 births
Living people
Mayors in Zeeland
Mayors in Overijssel
Members of the Senate (Netherlands)
Politicians from Rotterdam
Dutch Calvinist and Reformed Christians
Reformed Political Party politicians